MONATIO, short for Mouvement National (English: "National Movement") was a short-lived, supposedly nationalist, political faction in Cambodia. The exact nature of the group is still obscure. On April 17, 1975, as the Khmer Rouge entered Phnom Penh, this group took out a motor-cavalcade on the streets of the capital welcoming the arrival of the Khmer Rouge.

The group consisted of a handful of soldiers, dressed in black uniforms, accompanied by a number of students. MONATIO was led by Hem Keth Dara and the whole group in turn manipulated by Lon Non, brother of Lon Nol.

Initially tolerated by the Khmer Rouge, MONATIO members were later rounded up and executed. The Khmer Rouge regime later claimed that MONATIO had been a CIA conspiracy against the revolutionary government.

A movie on the events of 1975, called MONATIO, was made by Norodom Sihanouk.

References

External links

Cambodian nationalism
Political history of Cambodia
Factions of the Vietnam War
Rebel groups in Cambodia